Mount Mull is a mountain on the east flank of Irvine Glacier, standing 11 nautical miles (20 km) southwest of Mount Owen in the Guettard Range, Palmer Land, Antarctica. It was mapped by United States Geological Survey (USGS) from surveys and U.S. Navy air photos between 1961 and 1967, and named by Advisory Committee on Antarctic Names (US-ACAN) for William B. Mull, cook at South Pole Station in 1964.

Mountains of Palmer Land